Deportations of Hungarians to the Czech lands were a series of mass deportations of Hungarian population from southern Slovakia to Czech lands by Czechoslovak authorities. Deportations took place during the period from 1945 to 1947.

Deportations

Presidential Decree No. 071/1945 Coll. ("concerning the work duty of persons that had lost Czechoslovak citizenship") and No. 88/1945 Coll. ("concerning universal work duty") authorized the Czechoslovak administration to draft people into paid labor service for the maximum period of one year in order to redress some of the war damages. Under the disguise of "labor recruiting", the deportation of Hungarians from South Slovakia began to the recently vacated Czech borderlands. Those who could not prove that they either remained loyal to the Czechoslovakia during the war, or that they took part in liberation, or that they were subject to Nazi terror, also had their property confiscated under Presidential Decree No. 108/1945 Coll. ("concerning the confiscation of enemy property and on the Fund for National Restoration"). The transit trains were labelled as "voluntary agricultural workers". In fact, the real goal was to alter the ethnic composition of South Slovakia. These "labor recruitings" were named by Czech historian Karel Kaplan as "internal colonizations", and according to him their "political aim... was to transfer a part of the Hungarian minority away from the Hungarian border and to destroy it as a compact territorial unit. This colonization also had an immediate industrial goal – to provide the depopulated areas with a workforce".

Between July and August 1946, under the slogan "Slovak agricultural labor assisting the Czech lands", more Hungarians were deported to Czech lands. Eventually, 40,000-45,000-50,000 Hungarians were deported to Czech territories recently cleared of Sudeten Germans, but also to the other areas where labor force was required. While their properties in Slovakia were confiscated, they obtained the former Sudeten Germans' properties. According to the Slovak National Archives, 41,666 Hungarians had been deported from southern Slovakia.
Hungarians who stayed in Slovakia became the targets of the Slovak assimilation efforts.

See also
 Czechoslovak–Hungarian population exchange
 Slovakization
 Occupation of Southern Slovakia
 Hungarians in Slovakia

Notes

References

Bibliography

Cultural assimilation
Politics of Slovakia
Anti-Hungarian sentiment in Slovakia